This is a list of continuity announcers in the United Kingdom - the term "continuity announcer" is used for those broadcasters who provide the voice overs between television/radio programmes.

The majority of continuity announcements are broadcast live, with the exception of ITV2/ITVBe and most overnight continuity, which is pre-recorded during the previous day.

Some local announcing is made, prior to BBC Regional News.

Television

BBC

Former

ITV

Former

Channel 4

Freelance announcers

 Kelsey Bennett
 Amanda Carlton
 Lynsey Young
 Danny Cowan
 Simon Moore
 Beth Palmer
 Fraser Pender
 Gully Singh

Former

 Edward Adoo
 Louis Antwi
 Laura Aspinall
 Ali Ballantyne
 John Beasley
 Marcus Bentley
 Bill Bingham
 Sean Bolger
 Carole Bolt
 Jon Briggs
 Robin Brown
 Martin Buchanan
 Robin Burke
 Syd Burke
 Julia Cameron
 Paul Coia
 Jane Copland
 Michelle Dunn
 Ben Edwards
 Vanessa Edwards
 Sabrina Farley
 Adrian Finighan
 Barra Fitzgibbon
 Arlene Fleming
 Claire Gibb
 Alex Harris Goldberg
 Penny Gore
 Keith Harrison
 Tony Hawkins
 Olga Hubicka
 Veronika Hyks
 Tracy Ifeachor
 Hana Khalique
 Nigel Lambert
 John Leeson

 John Livesey
 Erica Longdon
 David MacLeod
 Tracey-Anne McCoy
 Paula Middlehurst
 David Miles
 Ric Mills
 Richard Mitchley
 Kate Moon
 Vuyiswa Ngqobougwana
 Trevor Nicholls
 Miles Otway
 Graham Rogers
 Alison Rooper
 Carlo Salvatore
 Paul Seed
 Andrea Simmons
 Kate Stephenson
 David Stranks
 Ian Swann
 Gary Terzza
 Jess Thom
 Linda Thomas
 Helen Veysey
 David Vickery
 Paula Vinnick
 Patrick Walker
 Lisa Walters
 Jane Watson
 Martin Weedon
 Soraya Willis
 Hayden Wood
 Joanne Zorian

S4C

Former

Channel 5

Former

Sky

Former

Radio

BBC

Former

References

 
Broadcasting in the United Kingdom
Radio in the United Kingdom
Continuity announcers